The haplochromis yellow black line (Mylochromis melanonotus) is a species of cichlid fish endemic to Lake Malawi where it is usually found over sandy substrates. This species can reach a length of  TL.

References

Haplochromis yellow black line
Fish described in 1922
Taxa named by Charles Tate Regan
Taxonomy articles created by Polbot